The Southern York County School District is a suburban, public school district in York County in the South Central region of Pennsylvania. It serves Codorus Township, Glen Rock, Railroad, New Freedom, Shrewsbury Township, Shrewsbury, and a portion of Hopewell Township. According to 2000 federal census data, it served a resident population of 18,592 people. By 2010, the district's population increased to 20,858 people. The educational attainment levels for the Southern York County School District population (25 years old and over) were 89.3% high school graduates and 26.5% college graduates.

According to the Pennsylvania Budget and Policy Center, 20.2% of the district's pupils lived at 185% or below the Federal Poverty level as shown by their eligibility for the federal free or reduced price school meal programs in 2012. In 2009, the Southern York County School District residents’ per capita income was $22,345, while the median family income was $60,438. In York County, the median household income was $57,494. In the Commonwealth, the median family income was $49,501 and the United States median family income was $49,445, in 2010.

Southern York County School District operates 5 schools: Friendship Elementary School, Shrewsbury Elementary School, Southern Elementary School, Southern Middle School, and Susquehannock High School. High school students may choose to attend York County School of Technology for training in the construction and mechanical trades. The Lincoln Intermediate Unit IU12 provides the district with a wide variety of services like specialized education for disabled students and hearing, speech and visual disability services and professional development for staff and faculty.

Extracurriculars
The district offers a variety of clubs, activities and an extensive sports program.

Sports
The district funds:

Boys
Baseball – AA
Basketball- AAA
Cross Country – AA
Football – AAA
Golf – AAA
Lacrosse – AA
Soccer – AA
Swimming and Diving – AA
Tennis – AAA
Track and Field – AAA
Volleyball – A
Wrestling – AAA

Girls
Basketball – AAA
Cross Country – AA
Field Hockey – AA
Lacrosse – AAAA
Soccer (Fall) – AA
Softball – AAA
Swimming and Diving – AA
Girls' Tennis – AAA
Track and Field – AAA
Volleyball – AAA

Middle School Sports

Boys
Basketball
Cross Country
Football
Track and Field
Wrestling	

Girls
Basketball
Cross Country
Field Hockey
Track and Field
Volleyball 

According to PIAA directory July 2012

References

School districts in York County, Pennsylvania